The pied cuckooshrike (Coracina bicolor) is a species of bird in the family Campephagidae.
It is endemic to Indonesia, where it is found in Sulawesi. Its natural habitats are subtropical or tropical moist lowland forest and subtropical or tropical mangrove forest.
It is threatened by habitat loss.

References 

pied cuckooshrike
Endemic birds of Sulawesi
pied cuckooshrike
Taxonomy articles created by Polbot